Tshoza Mukuta (born 24 October 1962) is a Congolese former professional boxer who competed from 1988 to 1993. As an amateur, he competed in the men's bantamweight event at the 1984 Summer Olympics.

References

External links
 

1962 births
Living people
Democratic Republic of the Congo male boxers
Olympic boxers of the Democratic Republic of the Congo
Boxers at the 1984 Summer Olympics
Place of birth missing (living people)
Bantamweight boxers
People from Lubumbashi